Spencer Raleigh Ware III (born November 23, 1991) is a former American football running back. He played college football at LSU, and played in the 2010 U.S. Army All-American Bowl. He was drafted in the sixth round of the 2013 NFL Draft by the Seattle Seahawks, with whom he won Super Bowl XLVIII as a rookie.

Early years
Ware attended and played high school football at Princeton High School.

College career
During his college football career, Ware rushed for 1,240 yards on 292 carries with ten touchdowns. Southeastern Conference coaches named him a second-team All-SEC selection after the 2011 season. He also played 21 games for the LSU Tigers baseball team.

After his junior season, Ware decided to forgo his senior season and entered the 2013 NFL Draft.

Collegiate statistics

Professional career

Seattle Seahawks 
Ware was drafted by the Seattle Seahawks in the sixth round of the 2013 NFL Draft with the 194th overall pick. He appeared in two games as a rookie and recorded three carries for ten yards. While Ware saw sparse usage throughout the season, the Seahawks went on to win the Super Bowl against the Denver Broncos in Super Bowl XLVIII. He was released on August 20, 2014.

Kansas City Chiefs 
On December 31, 2014, Ware signed a future contract with the Kansas City Chiefs.

On September 5, 2015, he was waived by the Chiefs and was re-signed to the practice squad. Ware was activated off the practice squad for the Week 8 matchup against the Detroit Lions for the NFL game in London on November 1, 2015. In this game, Ware scored his first NFL touchdown, a four-yard run, in the waning minutes of the fourth quarter against the Detroit Lions. Ware ended the 2015 season playing in 11 games with two starts, rushing for 403 yards and six touchdowns.

In 2016, with starter Jamaal Charles coming off a knee injury suffered in 2015, Ware became the starter for 2016. He started 14 games, rushing for 921 yards and three touchdowns. He also caught 33 passes for 447 yards and two touchdowns.

Coming into the 2017 season, Ware was projected to be the Chiefs' starting running back after the release of longtime starter Jamaal Charles. In the team's third preseason game against the Seattle Seahawks, Ware suffered a torn PCL and additional knee damage. He was placed on injured reserve on September 2, 2017. 

On November 30, 2018, he was named starting running back for the Kansas City Chiefs following the release of starting running back Kareem Hunt after he misled the team regarding an assault alleged to have occurred earlier that year. In his first game as the new starter, Ware achieved 47 rushing yards and one rushing touchdown against the Oakland Raiders. He finished the 2018 season with 246 rushing yards and two rushing touchdowns.

Indianapolis Colts 
On April 30, 2019, Ware signed with the Indianapolis Colts. He was placed on the reserve/physically unable to perform list on August 2, 2019 after undergoing ankle surgery. He was released on September 20, 2019.

Kansas City Chiefs (second stint)
On December 3, 2019, Ware was re-signed by the Kansas City Chiefs. He was placed on injured reserve on December 25, 2019 with a shoulder injury. He finished the 2019 season with 17 carries for 51 rushing yards in three games. Without Ware, the Chiefs would go on to win Super Bowl LIV against the San Francisco 49ers giving Ware his second Super Bowl ring.

Chicago Bears
On December 22, 2020, Ware signed with the practice squad of the Chicago Bears. His practice squad contract with the team expired after the season on January 18, 2021.

NFL statistics

Personal life
On January 12, 2014, Ware was booked in Seattle's King County Jail under the charge of DUI. However, that case was dismissed in July 2014 after a judge ruled that the officer lacked reasonable suspicion of DUI at the time he initiated the traffic stop.

On June 23, 2016, Ware hosted an event at Full Throttle Indoor Karting "where he provided free transportation, go-karting, and lunch to the thirty kids of the [Winton Hills] Recreational Center." Ware expressed gratitude for all the people who helped him become a professional athlete and encouraged the kids to "work together" to accomplish their goals in life.

References

External links
Kansas City Chiefs bio
LSU Tigers football bio
LSU Tigers baseball bio

1991 births
Living people
Players of American football from Cincinnati
American football running backs
Baseball players from Ohio
LSU Tigers football players
LSU Tigers baseball players
Seattle Seahawks players
Kansas City Chiefs players
Indianapolis Colts players
Chicago Bears players